Jahangir Oshidri (1921- October 22, 2004) was a high-level Mobad (priest or cleric) and a researcher of the Zoroastrians in Iran. He had studied and researched on the history of the Zoroastrians.

Biography 
Jahangir was born in 1921 in Kerman and went to primary and high schools there. In 1939, he entered the Faculty of Veterinary Medicine, University Of Tehran (FVM-UT) to continue his education. After retiring as a brigadier general in the army, he decided to study the Zoroastrian religion. In 1982, he was nominated as the Mobad by the Association of the Zoroastrian Priests. For several periods he was a member of the Zoroastrian Society, and after the death of the mobad, Rostam Shahzadi, he became the head of the Mobadan Association.

Bibliography 
Priest Oshidri has published various publications on the history and culture of the Iranian Zoroastrians.

 Light, Fire, Temple of Zoroastrianism
 Mazdayasna (Zoroastrianism) Encyclopedia: A Dictionary of Explanation about Zoroastrian
 History of Pahlavi and Zoroastrians
 Notes by Lord Kay Khosrow, Shahrokh
 The Veterinary History and Results of the 18th International Veterinary Congress (in three volumes)
 Horse in the Iranian Culture

References 

Zoroastrian priests
1921 births
2004 deaths
People from Kerman
University of Tehran alumni
Zoroastrian studies scholars
People from Kerman Province
Iranian Zoroastrians
Zoroastrian philosophical concepts
20th-century translators